Amy Elizabeth Imrie (née Pollard; 4 October 1870 – 4 April 1944), was a British heiress and one of the wealthiest women in Britain who, at the age of 37, became a Roman Catholic nun, Sister Mary Clare  and, subsequently, Mother Superior of the Order of Poor Clares.

Born as Amy Elizabeth Rosalie Pollard in British Guiana, nowadays Guyana, to William Branch Pollard and his first wife, Elizabeth Anne (née Blackley). After the death of her mother, at age 1, she went to live with her mother's sister Hannah and her husband William Imrie. She was later adopted by Hannah and William. William Imrie was co-owner of White Star Line shipping, and Amy was the sole heir to his fortune upon his death in 1906, receiving income from his estate during her life.

The following year she became Sister Mary Clare of the Order of Poor Clares, eventually leading the convent as Mother Clare. In 1910 she funded the building and interior decorating of St Mary of the Angels Roman Catholic Church in Liverpool, which is known as "the Vatican outside of Rome", because of the splendid artistry displayed in its interior.

Death
Imrie died 4 April 1944 in Looe, Cornwall, aged 73. She is buried behind the High Altar at Sclerder Abbey, Cornwall, England.

References

External links
Reproduction of the text accompanying the plaque (unveiled on 13 June 2003)

1870 births
1944 deaths
20th-century British Roman Catholic nuns
People from Liverpool
Converts to Roman Catholicism
People from Looe
Poor Clares
English philanthropists
British Guiana people
British adoptees